Dumbrăvița (until 1906 Vadászerdő; ; formerly Uisenteș) is a commune in Timiș County, Romania. It is composed of a single village, Dumbrăvița. One of the most developed and rich communes in Romania, Dumbrăvița has become in recent years a suburb of Timișoara.

Geography 
Dumbrăvița is located in the Timiș Plain, in the center of Timiș County, in the peri-urban area of Timișoara, to which it is attached. It borders Covaci, Cerneteaz and Giarmata to the north, Giarmata-Vii to the east and Timișoara to the south. Dumbrăvița is crossed by Behela and Niarad, two streams flowing about a kilometer away from the village. Their stream beds are poorly developed, and the streamflows are low.

Climate 

The area is characterized by a moderate continental climate with Mediterranean influences. The average annual temperature in Dumbrăvița is 12.4 °C. The temperatures are highest on average in August, at around 23.4 °C. The lowest average temperatures in the year occur in January, when it is around 0.6 °C. The annual rainfall is 717 mm. The period spanning from March to September has low atmospheric humidity, with values varying between 61% (July) and 69% (March). Sunny days represent about 75% of the total days. North winds have a higher frequency, followed by northeast winds. Mild winters and hot summers benefit the area, providing good conditions for early agricultural work.

Flora and fauna 
Spontaneous fauna is represented by hares, wild boars, foxes, voles, hamsters and birds such as quails and pheasants.

The vegetation is steppe-specific. Among the grasses can be found the blue eryngo and the feather grass, and among the shrubs the dog rose and the blackthorn.

History 
Dumbrăvița was founded in 1891 by the colonization of 133 Hungarian families from Szentes, a town 50 kilometers from Szeged. The colonization was officially organized and supported by the Hungarian government. It ordered the partial deforestation of the Green Forest that surrounds Timișoara, in order to accommodate the new settlement. However, the territory occupied today by Dumbrăvița has been inhabited since the Daco-Roman era, here being discovered five houses and three household pits dating from the 2nd–3rd centuries AD. The settlement seems to have been abandoned at the end of the 15th century, most likely due to the numerous attacks of the Turks. The new settlement founded in 1891 was called Vadászerdő; it is the translation from German into Hungarian of the compound word Jagdwald, which meant "hunting forest", the current Green Forest, used by Count Claude Florimond de Mercy, Austrian governor of Banat, after the conquest of the province by the Habsburgs. In 1892 the village already had several streets. At the request of its inhabitants, the village was renamed Újszentes ("New Szentes").

The construction of the Reformed church began in 1897, being funded by the Hungarian state; its consecration took place in 1901. Until then, locals belonged to the Reformed church in Timișoara. Very few at the beginning, Romanians started to settle in Dumbrăvița in greater numbers after the union of Banat with Romania. Thus, in 1921–1922, several families from Rusko Selo and Torak, from Serbian Banat and a few others from Comloșu Mare settled in Dumbrăvița. In 1927, another 42 Romanian families were put in possession of land. In the same year the Orthodox parish was established. In 1964, the name of the village was changed from Újszentes to the current name Dumbrăvița (literally "grove"). After the demolition of the church in Stanciova, in 1976, authorities approved the construction of a Roman Catholic church here. The first Eastern Orthodox church in Dumbrăvița was built only in 2005.

Demographics 

Dumbrăvița had a population of 7,522 inhabitants at the 2011 census, up 179% from the 2002 census. More recent estimates show that the population of Dumbrăvița has exceeded 10,000 inhabitants. Most inhabitants are Romanians (76.07%), larger minorities being represented by Hungarians (14.05%) and Germans (1.16%). For 6.37% of the population, ethnicity is unknown. By religion, most inhabitants are Orthodox (67.34%), but there are also minorities of Roman Catholics (10.5%), Reformed (7.25%), Pentecostals (1.78%), Greek Catholics (1.75%) and Baptists (1.62%). For 6.99% of the population, religious affiliation is unknown.

Economy 
According to a study by the Regionalization Advisory Council in 2013, Dumbrăvița is the most developed locality in Romania. In recent years, Dumbrăvița has experienced a strong development, given its proximity to Timișoara, Dumbrăvița tending to become a suburb of the city. This development was mainly due to projects on European funds; between 2007 and 2013 alone, Dumbrăvița attracted over three million euros. Dumbrăvița's economy is dominated by the rising service sector, to which is added a well-developed industrial sector. The agricultural activities have an insignificant weight in the commune's economy, being reduced to the practice of subsistence farming. Trade is the subsector that has known the widest entrepreneurial dynamics, so that, currently, over 35% of the companies in Dumbrăvița are active in this field.

Twin towns 
Dumbrăvița is twinned with the following towns:
  Sándorfalva
  Szentes
  Žitište

Gallery

References 

Communes in Timiș County
Localities in Romanian Banat